The 12035 / 36 Jaipur Agra Fort Shatabdi Express was a Superfast Express train of the Shatabdi Express category belonging to Indian Railways - North Western Railway zone that ran between Jaipur and Agra in India. The train services were terminated from May 1, 2018. And it is no longer in service from Jaipur to Agra. But a new train was introduced from Ajmer to Agra Fort Intercity and will soon convert to Jp-Af Jan Shatabdi Express. This train has been launched instead of Jp-Af Shatabdi Express.

It operated as train number 12035 from Jaipur Junction to Agra Fort and as train number 12036 in the reverse direction serving the states of Rajasthan & Uttar Pradesh.

Coaches

The 12035 / 36 Jaipur Agra Fort Shatabdi Express presently has 1 AC First Class, 7 AC Chair Car & 2 End on Generator coaches at the starting day but after that it has 1 A.C. First Class (Executive Chair Car) and 4 A.C. Chair Car. It does not carry a Pantry car coach but being a Shatabdi category train, catering is arranged on board the train.

As is customary with most train services in India, Coach Composition may be amended at the discretion of Indian Railways depending on demand.

Service

The 12035 Jaipur Agra Fort Shatabdi Express covers the distance of 241 kilometres in 03 hours 30 mins (68.86 km/hr) and in 04 hours 20 mins as 12036 Agra Fort Jaipur Shatabdi Express (55.62 km/hr).

As the average speed of the train is above , as per Indian Railway rules, its fare includes a Superfast surcharge.

Routeing

The 12035 / 36 Jaipur Agra Fort Shatabdi Express runs from Jaipur Junction via Gandhinagar Jaipur, Bharatpur Junction to Agra Fort.

Being a Shatabdi class train, it returns to its originating station Jaipur Junction at the end of the day.

Loco link

As the route is yet to be electrified, a Bhagat Ki Kothi based WDP 4 powers the train for its entire journey. After that due to small in size the engine is replace with WDM 3A of ABR railway station.

Timings

12035 Jaipur Agra Fort Shatabdi Express leaves Jaipur Junction every day except Thursday at 07:05 hrs IST and reaches Agra Fort at 10:35 hrs IST the same day.

12036 Agra Fort Jaipur Shatabdi Express]] leaves Agra Fort every day except Thursday at 18:00 hrs IST and reaches Jaipur Junction at 22:20 hrs IST the same day.

References 

Shatabdi Express trains
Rail transport in Rajasthan
Transport in Jaipur
Trains from Agra